Pauline is an unincorporated community and census-designated place (CDP) in Spartanburg County, South Carolina, United States. It was first listed as a CDP in the 2020 census with a population of 209.

Until the 1890s, Pauline was known as Stribling. The community took the name "Pauline" when they were to name a post office and the name "Stribling" was already taken; "Pauline" was the first name of the postmaster's daughter at the time.

Pauline has a post office with the zip code 29374.

The William Dixon Fowler House was listed on the National Register of Historic Places in 2012.

Education
It is in Spartanburg County School District 6.

Demographics

2020 census

Note: the US Census treats Hispanic/Latino as an ethnic category. This table excludes Latinos from the racial categories and assigns them to a separate category. Hispanics/Latinos can be of any race.

References

Census-designated places in Spartanburg County, South Carolina
Census-designated places in South Carolina
Unincorporated communities in Spartanburg County, South Carolina
Unincorporated communities in South Carolina